Lisa Ellis (born August 28, 1975) is an American educator who was the 2022 Democratic nominee for South Carolina's superintendent of education and is the founder of the education advocacy group SC for Ed. She was defeated by Republican Ellen Weaver in the November 2022 general election.

Personal life and career

Ellis is an educator in Richland School District Two in Columbia, South Carolina. She is the student activities director at Blythewood High School. Additionally, she has taught at Ridge View High School, Hand Middle School, and Fairfield Middle School in Columbia.

In 2019, Ellis founded an educational advocacy group, SC for Ed, with the purposes of improving teacher retention, increasing teacher pay, and  decreasing class sizes. In May 2019, SC for Ed led a march at the South Carolina Statehouse, in which over 10,000 people marched. In the years since the organizations founding, Ellis has led various marches and protests and advocated for stricter COVID-19 measures,including mask mandates and virtual learning, a reduction of gun violence in schools, higher teacher pay, and the implementation of race-based conversations in classrooms.  After winning the June 2022 Democratic primary for state superintendent, Ellis stepped down from her position as executive director of SC for Ed to focus on her campaign. She is the only candidate to ever run for state superintendent of education while simultaneously remaining a classroom teacher.

Politics
On June 14, 2022, Ellis won the Democratic primary against Gary Burgess, former Anderson County School District 4 Superintendent and Jerry Govan, South Carolina House representative. She secured 50.1% of the vote, avoiding a runoff election by 199 votes. She faces Republican Ellen Weaver in the November 2022 general election. If elected, Ellis will succeed the incumbent superintendent, Republican Molly Spearman, who did not seek a third term. In the debate for superintendent of education, Ellis advocated in favor of social and emotional learning (SEL), drawing criticism from Ellen Weaver and Kathy Maness, who accused the idea of being associated with Critical race theory and "theory-laden." Ellis and her opponent, Ellen Weaver, have garnered more news coverage and attention to the race for superintendent of education than most races in the past. Political experts have cited this as the most partisan election in recent history because of the current national spotlight on educational issues. Weaver has made claims that "woke indoctrination" has been taking place in schools. In a September 2022 interview, Ellis said that the General Assembly's attempt to outlaw the teaching of critical race theory was "unnecessary," and that the legislature has "created a ghost to get away from what is actually happening in schools" in an effort to redirect funding for public education to private schools.

Critics of Ellis, especially the media blog FITSNews, have labeled Eliis and her advocacy group group as "liberal" or "mob" or "union." Local news outlets such as The State newspaper and WIS (TV) as well as members of the South Carolina General Assembly have cited data and opinions from Ellis in explaining issues like the state teacher shortage.

After winning the primary election, Ellis announced she would step down as executive director of SC for Ed, though she intends on remaining a classroom teacher throughout her campaign. Ellis was the first Democrat to run for superintendent since 2014; Molly Spearman ran unopposed in 2018. Ellis received the endorsement of the Majority Whip of the United States House of Representatives, Jim Clyburn, and of Jim Rex, the last Democrat to hold the office since 2011. Ellis was also the nominee for state superintendent of education for the Alliance Party. Receiving only 43% of the popular vote, Ellis lost the general election Weaver. She conceded the election following day.

Electoral history

Notes

References

External links
 Campaign website

1975 births
Living people
South Carolina Democrats
College of Charleston alumni
Clemson University alumni
Columbia College (South Carolina) alumni
21st-century American educators
21st-century American women educators
Politicians from Columbia, South Carolina